Cambodia's Next Top Model(Cambodia'sNTM or CamNTM) is a Cambodian reality TV series, based on Tyra Banks' America's Next Top Model.

The show is produced by Cambodian television channel MYTV and CTN. Casting calls for the show began during early April and ended on May 31, 2014. The judges for the show have been revealed to be Cambodian model Kouy Chandanich, fashion photographer Chem Vuth Sovin, Cambodian-American fashion designer Remy Hou, and Cambodian TV presenter Yok Chenda. Chenda serves the role of Tyra Banks as head judge and host of the show. The semi-finalists chosen to compete for season one were revealed on the show's official Facebook page.

Seasons

References

External links
Official Site

Top Model
Cambodian television series
2014 Cambodian television series debuts
2010s Cambodian television series
Non-American television series based on American television series
Cambodian Television Network original programming